The Venezuelan herring (Jenkinsia parvula) is a species of fish in the family Clupeidae. It is endemic to Venezuela.

References

Sources

Venezuelan herring
Fish of Venezuela
Endemic fauna of Venezuela
Venezuelan herring
Venezuelan herring
Taxa named by Efigenio Velazquez
Taxonomy articles created by Polbot